The 2015 South Dakota State Jackrabbits football team represented South Dakota State University in the 2015 NCAA Division I FCS football season. They were led by 18th-year head coach John Stiegelmeier and played their home games at Coughlin–Alumni Stadium. They were a member of the Missouri Valley Football Conference. They finished the season 8–4, 5–3 in MVFC play to finish in a three-way tie for third place. They received an at-large bid to the FCS playoffs where they lost in the first round to Montana.

Schedule

Game summaries

At Kansas

Southern Utah

Robert Morris

North Dakota State

Indiana State

At Youngstown State

Northern Iowa

At Missouri State

Illinois State

At South Dakota

At Western Illinois

FCS playoffs

First round – at Montana

Ranking movements

References

South Dakota State
South Dakota State Jackrabbits football seasons
South Dakota State
South Dakota State Jackrabbits football